The Schermzaal ("Fencing Hall") was a sports venue located in Amsterdam, Netherlands. During the 1928 Summer Olympics, it hosted the fencing and the fencing part of the modern pentathlon events.

It was located next to the Olympic Stadium.

The venue has since been demolished.

References

 1928 Summer Olympics official report. pp. 202, 205.

Venues of the 1928 Summer Olympics
Defunct sports venues in the Netherlands
Olympic fencing venues
Olympic modern pentathlon venues
Sports venues in Amsterdam